I.G.I.-2: Covert Strike, known in the PAL region as Project I.G.I. 2, is a 2003 tactical shooter video game developed by Innerloop Studios and released by Codemasters. The game is a stealth-based first-person shooter. It is the sequel to Innerloop's Project I.G.I.. The original, published by Eidos Interactive, offered only single-player play, and no game saves. Covert Strike added multiplayer play and limited save game capability. Chris Ryan, a former Special Air Service operative best known for being the lone successful escapee of Bravo Two Zero, served as a consultant to the game.

The game's plot features a rogue Chinese General, "Wu Xing" as the primary antagonist. Xing orchestrates various events (such as armed robbery of advanced prototype technology from the Russian mafia) in order to get electromagnetic pulse (EMP) weaponry on a space rocket that he has launch control over.

The game was banned in China after six months of sales (having passed censor inspection with an incomplete copy of the game that lacked the final six levels of Chinese content), because it was perceived to damage the Chinese army's image.

Plot
The game's protagonist, David Jones, an agent working for the Institute for Geotactical Intelligence and former British SAS operator, was sent to the Carpathian mountains to recover a set of prototype EMP chips stolen by a group of Russian mafia from a high-tech US facility. After HALO jumping and infiltrating a weather station, Jones retrieves a chip that was stolen. The researchers at IGI conclude after close examination that the chip that Jones found was actually an improved version of the chip. Then his mission director (Phillip White having replaced an injured Rebecca Anya) commands him to go to retrieve the remaining EMP chips so that the IGI researchers can launch a full scale research on the chips to determine their real usage for which the Russian mafia stole them for. He is then transported to a local Russian storage facility where a convoy carrying the chips is due to arrive. He is instructed to obtain C4 explosives from the facility and destroy the bridge on which the convoy would pass and retrieve the chips by intercepting the convoy. After successful completion of his objective, he is then transported to a Russian weapons production facility to get the remaining EMP chips and their blue prints on White's orders. After this incident, he is betrayed by his pilot, Robert Quest and mission director, Phillip White as they take the EMP chips obtained by Jones. Jones is forced to jump from the helicopter in which he was being carried by Quest and he eventually finds himself at the borders of Ukraine and Romania, where he is forced to evade the incoming border patrols while being ill-equipped.

Meanwhile, his former pilot and mission director had escaped and have taken away the EMP chips along with their blue prints. The IGI was not able to detect their whereabouts after the incident, but spent enough efforts to get an important detail that Phillip White and Robert Quest took years to infiltrate the IGI and gain its trust and that White had made several weapons and military deals with Jach Priboi in Libya. Anya returns as Jones' mission director and Jones sets off to Libya under the orders of Senator Lenahan to search for the middle-aged Priboi, who had been locked up by the Libyan Intelligence as he was supplying weapons to the rebel forces, after David finds Priboi, he is captured by the Libyan intelligence commander Major Zaleb Said. The two are then transported to a heavily guarded Libyan prison. While they are being transported, Priboi asks him about his purpose of finding him, Jones responds by saying that he is after his former mission director Phillip White and that the IGI knows that White made weapon deals with him. Priboi then reveals that he made a lot of deals with White and sold him advanced equipment. His last order from Priboi was a high tech Russian ekranoplan which was waiting for delivery on a remote sea port in the gulf. The shipping papers were in a safe in Priboi's villa which was currently taken over by Major Zaleb Said and being used as his base of operations.

After rescuing Priboi and escaping out of the prison, David decides to go to the villa to get the information. While going there, David blows the truck's engine in which they escaped. Priboi then told him that he needs to infiltrate the villa by disabling the security system and bypassing Major Said's guards. He also needs to take his hard disk which contains all the data for Priboi's transactions with White. Surprisingly, after expunging much effort and going through many of gunfights, Priboi discovers that Major Said had taken away his papers from the villa and he then vows angrily to take them back. He tells David to take control of his helicopter which is in his airbase not far away from the villa now controlled by Major Said. They get the helicopter without much conflict, and manage to gun Major Said down at one of his bases amidst the opposition to get the papers back. Upon returning to his villa, Priboi tells David that the trade he made with David's former mission director was on Port Bur Safaga in Egypt and that Robert Quest would be taking delivery of the plane in 3 days.

David sets off to the port without hesitation, where he is instructed by Anya to find the Enkranoplan and a crate of stolen EMP chips. While searching the log books to find the Enkranoplan, David discovers that Robert Quest and Phillip White were actually cooperating with an unknown country to operate the chips. He is confronted by his former pilot in the process who orders his men to throw David in the water with the sewage. David ambushes Quest's men and kills him after a confrontation. He then takes the ekranoplan to venture off to unknown country which is later revealed to be the Spratly Islands near China, where, according to Anya, suspicious activities are carried out throughout the time being. After a series of events, David finds his former mission director cooperating in secrecy with a Chinese general, whom he found out later to be General Wu Xing, who plans to use the chips to blindfold US intelligence and cripple the powers within.

Later David finds his former mission director Phillip White killed by General Wu Xing himself, as the former accused the latter of killing his friend Robert Quest, who was actually killed by David at the Egyptian port. In Wu Xing's secret weapons lab, David Jones gets to know that the General was going to start a "World War III". He then engages in a gunfight with Wu Xing and kills him.

David tracks the entire plan location to a large and closely guarded rocket launch pad, where Anya asks him to disable the system immediately before the launch is made. With efforts, David then succeeds in preventing the rocket from  heading towards its programmed destination and to detonate somewhere safe.

Gameplay

Missions
The game is divided into 19 missions. The story is presented in cutscenes, shown before and after every mission, with animated characters rendered in real-time and pre-recorded speech. Missions have objectives that must be completed before the mission ends.

Straightforward approaches are not encouraged, with stealthy and covert movement giving the player a better rating, rank and chance of survival, with the highest attainable ranking entitled 'David Jones'.

Multiple paths exist for every mission, with the most obvious and daunting being a noisy gunfight, because in every mission Jones is outnumbered. Every mission presents an opportunity for large groups of enemies to be bypassed or sneaked past, undiscovered. Certain missions even require entire operations to be carried out undetected.

At the start of a new game, a difficulty level can be chosen, changing the number of bullets Jones takes before dying, the intelligence of the enemy and group AI, and the number of save-games available.

Covert operation

Jones is equipped with lock picks, and safe crackers making him capable of forced entry into any locked room or safe, enabling noiseless and stealthy entry into restricted areas and buildings, and obtaining military secrets or private information, and objects. Remote-controlled CR-4 explosives are also available for use on certain ground targets, meaning large structures can be destroyed safely, from a distance, leaving Jones undetected. Air strikes can be called for on certain missions, using the laser designator to pinpoint ground targets for bombing.

Reception

The game received "mixed" reviews according to the review aggregation website Metacritic. IGN gave it a favourable review over a month before its U.S. release date.

References

External links

2003 video games
Codemasters games
First-person shooters
Multiplayer online games
Spy video games
Tactical shooter video games
Video game sequels
Video games developed in Norway
Video games set in China
Video games set in Egypt
Video games set in Libya
Windows games
Windows-only games
Works banned in China
Multiplayer and single-player video games